Events from the year 1790 in Russia

Incumbents
 Monarch – Catherine II

Events
 Russo-Turkish War (1787–1792)
 May 17-18: Battle of Andros (1790)
 July 19: Battle of Kerch Strait (1790)
 September 8-9: Battle of Tendra
 December 22: Conclusion of Siege of Izmail

 Russo-Swedish War (1788–90)
 April 29: Battle of Valkeala
 April 30: Battle of Pardakoski–Kärnakoski
 May 13: Battle of Reval
 May 15: Battle of Fredrikshamn
 May 19-20: Battle of Keltis
 June 3: Battle of Savitaipal
 June 3-4: Battle of Kronstadt
 June 16: Battle of Uransari
 July 2-3: Battle of Björkösund
 July 4: Battle of Vyborg Bay (1790)
 July 9-10: Battle of Svensksund
 August 14: Treaty of Värälä

 Church of the Ascension (Chaltyr) founded
 Holy Trinity Cathedral of the Alexander Nevsky Lavra completed
 Kokushkin Bridge built
 Journey from St. Petersburg to Moscow by Alexander Radishchev published

Births

 Sima Babovich, Hakham of the Crimean Karaites
 Dmitry Buturlin, general, historian, censor
 Pyotr Yegorovich Chistyakov, explorer, admiral, fifth governor of Russian America
 Matvey Dmitriev-Mamonov, nobleman, writer, and general
 Pyotr Gorchakov, general
 Ivan Liprandi, spy, general, memoirist
 Anastasia Novitskaya, ballerina
 Fedor Panyutin, general
 Platon Shirinsky-Shikhmatov, education minister (1850-1853)
 Mirza Jafar Topchubashev, Russian orientalist and poet from Azerbaijan
 Sergei Petrovich Trubetskoy, military officer and Decembrist organizer
 Alexander von Lüders, general
 Kapiton Zelentsov, artist and illustrator

Deaths

 Ivan Ivanovich Möller-Sakomelsky, general
 Mikhail Ivanovich Popov, writer, poet, dramatist, librettist
 Mikhail Shcherbatov, historian, writer, philosopher, statesman
 Grigory Spiridov, admiral

References

1790 in Russia
Years of the 18th century in the Russian Empire